Dhari Hambir Malla Dev, also known as Dhari Hambeera was the fiftieth king of the Mallabhum. He ruled from 1620 to 1626 CE.

History

Personal life
Dhari Hambir Malla Dev had only one son named Kalaram who was deaf and mentally disabled. This son was unable to run a state.

Mallabhum temples
During his regime a Siva temple named Maleshwar temple was established.

References

Sources
 

17th-century Indian monarchs
Kings of Mallabhum
Malla rulers
Mallabhum